A Defence of Masochism is a 1998 non-fiction book by Anita Phillips covering the topic of BDSM, which offers philosophical and sociological arguments for the virtues of masochism.

See also
Beauty calibrator (depicted in cover art)

References

External links
Anita Phillips. A Defence of Masochism. London: Faber & Faber, 1998. 

BDSM literature
Sociology books
1998 non-fiction books